The Virginia Slims Clay Court Championships, also known as the Virginia Slims of Chicago,  was a women's tennis tournament played on outdoor clay courts at the Lake Bluff Bath & Tennis Club in Chicago, Illinois in the United States that was part of the 1971 WT Pro Tour. It was the inaugural edition of the tournament and was held from August 19 through August 22, 1971. Third-seeded Françoise Dürr won the singles title and earned $4,100 first-prize money.

Finals

Singles
 Françoise Dürr defeated  Billie Jean King 6–4, 6–2

Doubles
 Judy Dalton /  Françoise Dürr defeated  Rosemary Casals /  Billie Jean King 6–4, 7–6

Prize money

References

Virginia Slims of Chicago
Virginia Slims
Clay court tennis tournaments
Virginia Slims